Edward Ernest Hammond (26 June 1910 – 5 May 1988) was an Australian rules footballer who played with North Melbourne in the Victorian Football League (VFL).

Notes

External links 

1910 births
1988 deaths
Australian rules footballers from Victoria (Australia)
North Melbourne Football Club players